Charles Martin (29 March 1863 – 14 May 1954) was an Australian cricketer. He played in three first-class matches for South Australia in 1895/96, and he represented the Middlesex club in the Adelaide Metropolitan cricket competition playing in their Premiership teams of 1889, 1890, and 1891 as Vice-captain. He also represented South Australia in football and in his career he worked for the South Australian Gas Company for fifty-three years.

See also
 List of South Australian representative cricketers

References

External links
 

1863 births
1954 deaths
Australian cricketers
South Australia cricketers
Cricketers from Adelaide